Jean-Max (1895–1970) was a French film actor.

Selected filmography
 The Prosecutor Hallers (1930)
 Le cap perdu (1931)
 The Unknown Singer (1931)
 The Darling of Paris (1931)
 Suzanne (1932)
 Once Upon a Time (1933)
 Sapho (1934)
 Pension Mimosas (1935)
 Koenigsmark (1935)
 Second Bureau (1935)
 Les yeux noirs (1935)
 Port Arthur (1936)
 Nitchevo (1936)
 J'accuse! (1938)
 The Woman Thief (1938)
 I Was an Adventuress (1938)
 Criminal Brigade (1947)
 Children of Love (1953)
 More Whiskey for Callaghan (1955)

References

Bibliography
 Goble, Alan. The Complete Index to Literary Sources in Film. Walter de Gruyter, 1999.

External links

1890s births
1970 deaths
French male film actors
Male actors from Paris